Hartleyville is an unincorporated community in Athens County, in the U.S. state of Ohio. The community lies near the mouth of Johnson Run creek.

History
A 2003 local newspaper report describes it as "almost forgotten".
A post office called Hartleyville was established in 1851, and remained in operation until 1893.

References

Unincorporated communities in Athens County, Ohio
1851 establishments in Ohio
Populated places established in 1851
Unincorporated communities in Ohio